Zinc finger C3H1-type containing is a protein that in humans is encoded by the ZFC3H1 gene.

References

Further reading